Cobbetts Pond is a  water body located in Rockingham County in southern New Hampshire, United States, in the town of Windham.

Cobbetts Pond is home to many different types of lakeside homes, ranging from seasonal cottages to year-round multimillion-dollar houses. These homes are all part of the Cobbett's Pond Village District. Located on the west edge of the pond is the Windham Town Beach, which is open to the public and has an enclosed swimming area. The area is supervised by a lifeguard.

During the summer months, watersport shows, boat parades, and fireworks take place. There are no posted speed limits for boats, but there is a warden that occasionally patrols the pond by boat. The winter months are less busy on the pond, since most homes are only seasonal and fit to be used in warm weather. Ice fishing and skating are common activities during the winter.

Cobbetts Pond is primarily a spring-fed body of water. Water from the pond flows via Golden Brook and Beaver Brook to the Merrimack River in Lowell, Massachusetts.

The pond is classified as a warmwater fishery, with observed species including smallmouth bass, largemouth bass, chain pickerel, brown bullhead, and bluegill.

See also

List of lakes in New Hampshire

References

Lakes of Rockingham County, New Hampshire